Dr. Alice Lovina Kibbe (27 June 1881 – 21 January 1969) was an American botanist, and Professor and Chair of Biology at Carthage College in Carthage, Illinois from 1920 to 1956. She was noted in the region as a natural historian, philanthropist and traveler, and for her role as an early female academic leader.

Life
She graduated from State Normal School, and from the University of Washington in 1910 with A.B. and in 1914 with M.A., and Cornell University in 1920 with M.S. and in 1926 with Ph.D. thesis "A Plant Survey of Hancock Co., Illinois".

When Carthage College relocated in 1964, Dr. Kibbe returned to her native state of Washington, dedicating much of her local property to public use.  
Her donation of a wooded tract on the Mississippi River near Warsaw, Illinois formed the core of the  Alice L. Kibbe Life Science Research Station, operated by Western Illinois University.
Dr. Kibbe's extensive personal natural history collections are housed in the Kibbe Hancock Heritage Museum in Carthage.

References

External links
"Welcome to the Alice L. Kibbe Life Science Station" at Western Illinois University
Visitors Guide to Kibbe Hancock Heritage Museum

American women biologists
American botanists
Carthage College faculty
1881 births
1969 deaths
20th-century American women scientists
20th-century American scientists
People from McCook County, South Dakota
20th-century American philanthropists
American women academics